Creseis virgula is a species of gastropods belonging to the family Creseidae. The larvae are zooplankton. 

The species has almost cosmopolitan distribution.

References

Creseidae
Gastropods described in 1828